The 7th Ryder Cup Matches were held November 1–2, 1947 at Portland Golf Club in Portland, Oregon, marking a resumption of the competition after a full decade. World War II forced cancellations from 1939 to 1945; the last competition was in 1937. The United States overwhelmed the British team, 11–1.

An invitation to renew the Ryder Cup was sent by the American P.G.A. in November 1946. This was accepted by the British P.G.A. in December. However it was not until August 1947 that the dates and venue were agreed.

The revival of the Ryder Cup in 1947 was initiated by Portland businessman Robert A. Hudson, who paid for the expenses of the teams and chaired the event. He even met the British team in New York, threw a lavish party at the Waldorf-Astoria, and accompanied them on the four-day rail journey across the U.S. to Portland.

The course had hosted the stroke play Portland Open on the PGA Tour in 1944 and 1945, won by Sam Snead and Ben Hogan, and the match play PGA Championship in August 1946, won by Hogan.

The American team won all four matches on the opening day and continued to dominate by winning all but one singles match. The only British victory in the competition came when Sam King beat Herman Keiser 4 & 3.

Played in the Pacific Northwest in November in wind and rain, soft course conditions prevailed as a week-long rain preceded the event. The next several matches in the U.S. were played in more southerly venues.

Format
The Ryder Cup is a match play event, with each match worth one point.  From 1927 through 1959, the format consisted of 4 foursome (alternate shot) matches on the first day and 8 singles matches on the second day, for a total of 12 points.  Therefore, 6 points were required to win the Cup.  All matches were played to a maximum of 36 holes.

Teams
Source:

This was the first of only two Ryder Cups for Hogan as a player and the second and final appearance for Byron Nelson, later the non-playing captain in 1965. Hogan was to be a non-playing captain in 1949 and 1967.

In January 1947 the British P.G.A. appointed a selection committee of five. This committee included three ex-Ryder Cup players: Bill Davies, George Duncan and Charles Whitcombe. In early August they announced a list of 14 players from which the final 10 would be chosen. The winner of the News of the World Match Play would also be included in the list. In early September they announced the first seven members of the team: Cotton (captain), Daly, Rees, King, Adams, Ward and Horne. They also added two new names to the list of possible players (Arthur Lees and Laurie Ayton, Jnr), leaving nine or ten players competing for the remaining three places. Later in September two more players were selected: Green and Lees, to which would be added the winner of the Match Play Championship or Max Faulkner if the winner of that tournament should already be in the team or ineligible. The final place fell to Faulkner on September 26 when three of the semi-finalists in the Match Play Championship were already in the team and the fourth (Flory Van Donck, a Belgian) was ineligible.

The British team was accompanied by Commander R.C.T. Roe, Secretary of the British P.G.A., who acted as manager of the team. They left from Southampton for New York on the Queen Mary on October 18.

Saturday's foursome matches

18 hole scores: Oliver/Worsham: 6 up, Snead/Mangrum: 6 up, Adams/Faulkner: 2 up, Rees/King: 1 up.

Sunday's singles matches

Individual player records
Each entry refers to the win–loss–half record of the player.

Source:

United States

Great Britain

Eric Green and Reg Horne did not play in any matches.

References

External links
PGA of America: 1947 Ryder Cup
GolfCompendium.com: 1947 Ryder Cup

Ryder Cup
Golf in Oregon
Sports competitions in Oregon
Ryder Cup
Ryder Cup
Ryder Cup
1947 in Portland, Oregon
Ryder Cup